The Los Angeles Lakers radio networks consist of two separate networks for the coverage of the National Basketball Association (NBA)'s Los Angeles Lakers basketball team.  One is an English language network while the other is a Spanish language network.  There are 17 total stations in four states (Arizona, California, Nevada, and New Mexico) between the two networks.

On-air personnel
Current announcers for the English-language network include John Ireland as the play-by-play announcer since 2011.  The color commentator since 2004 is former Lakers player (with the team for their 1987 & 1988 championships) Mychal Thompson. Thompson, who originally worked with Spiro Deedes stayed on as an announcer when the broadcasts moved from KLAC to KSPN at the start of the 2009-2010 season.

Former on-air personnel for the network have included legendary play-by-play announcer Chick Hearn and former NBA player Stu Lantz as a color commentator.  Pat Riley served as a color commentator for the network from 1977 until late 1979 when he became an assistant coach for the team.

English-language network

The English-language Los Angeles Lakers Radio Network is a three-state, 11-station network with KSPN ("710 ESPN") serving as the flagship. Starting with the 2009-2010 season, KSPN took over the flagship position under a five-year deal, thus ending the Lakers' three-decade relationship with KLAC. KLAC served as the Lakers' flagship station from 1977 to 2009.

Network affiliates

California

Hawaii

New Mexico

Spanish-language network
The Spanish-language network is a two-state, four-station network with KWKW serving as its flagship.

Network affiliates

California

Nevada

Former affiliates for either network

Arizona

California

Nevada

References

External links
Broadcast page on the Lakers' website
L.A. Times blog: Lakers announce switch to 710 ESPN

Radio Network
National Basketball Association on the radio
Mass media in Los Angeles County, California
Sports radio networks in the United States